The Zambeze Coal Mine is a coal mine located in Tete, Changara District, Tete Province. The mine has coal reserves amounting to 9 billion tonnes of coking coal, one of the largest coal reserves in Africa and the world.

References 

Coal mines in Mozambique
Tete, Mozambique